Ariclenes Venâncio Martins (born 29 March 1930), known professionally as Lima Duarte, is a Brazilian actor. He played a number of characters in Brazilian telenovelas, such as Zeca Diabo in O Bem-Amado and Sinhozinho Malta in Roque Santeiro. He first appeared on Brazilian television in 1950. He also worked as a voice actor in 1960s, being the voice of Top Cat ("Manda-Chuva" in Portuguese), Wally Gator and Dum-Dum (Touche Turtle's friend). He has worked with Brazilian and Portuguese directors, such as Fábio Barreto, Paulo Rocha and Manoel de Oliveira.

Filmography 
Soap Operas
 2022 – Além da Ilusão
 2017 – O Outro Lado do Paraíso .... Josafá Tavares
 2015 – I Love Paraisópolis .... Dom Pepino
 2010 – Araguaia .... Max Martinez
 2009 – India – A Love Story .... Shankar
 2007 – Desejo Proibido .... Mayor Viriato "Condor" Palhares
 2007 – Amazônia, de Galvez a Chico Mendes .... Bento
 2005 – Belíssima .... Murat Güney
 2004 – O Pequeno Alquimista .... Filolal
 2004 – Senhora do Destino .... Senator Vitório Vianna (special guest)
 2004 – Da Cor do Pecado .... Alfonso Lambertini
 2003 – Sítio do Picapau Amarelo .... João Melado 
 2002 – O Quinto dos Infernos .... Conde dos Arcos
 2002 – Sabor da Paixão .... Miguel Maria Coelho
 2001 – Porto dos Milagres .... Senator Vitório Vianna
 2000 – Uga-Uga .... Nikos Karabastos
 1999 – O Auto da Compadecida .... Bishop
 1998 – River of Gold
 1998 – Pecado Capital .... Tonho Alicate (special guest)
 1998 – Corpo Dourado .... Zé Paulo (special guest)
 1997 – A Indomada .... Murilo Pontes (special guest)
 1996 – O Fim do Mundo .... Coronel Ildásio Junqueira
 1995 – A Próxima Vítima .... Zé Bolacha
 1993 – Fera Ferida .... Major Emiliano Cerqueira Bentes
 1993 – Agosto .... Turco Velho
 1993 – O Mapa da Mina .... delegado (participação)
 1992 – Pedra sobre Pedra .... Murilo Pontes
 1990 – Meu Bem, Meu Mal .... Dom Lázaro Venturini
 1990 – Rainha da Sucata .... Onofre Pereira (special guest)
 1989 – O Salvador da Pátria .... Sassá Mutema (Salvador da Silva)
 1985 – Roque Santeiro .... Sinhozinho Malta
 1985 – O Tempo e o Vento .... major Rafael Pinto Bandeira
 1984 – Partido Alto .... Cocada (special guest)
 1982 – Paraíso .... João das Mortes (special guest)
 1980–1984 – O Bem-amado .... Zeca Diabo (in TV series)
 1979 – Marron Glacê .... Oscar
 1979 – Pai Herói .... Malta Cajarana (special guest)
 1977 – Espelho Mágico .... Carijó
 1975 – Pecado Capital .... Salviano Lisboa
 1974 – O Rebu .... Boneco
 1973 – Os Ossos do Barão .... Egisto Ghirotto
 1973 – O Bem-Amado .... Zeca Diabo (in telenovela)
 1971 – A Fábrica .... Pepê
 1961 – Top Cat .... Top Cat / Spook (voices)
 1961 – Sua Vida Me Pertence

Films
 2013 – A Busca
 2012 – Colegas
 2012 – E a Vida Continua...
 2011 – Assalto ao Banco Central
 2011 – Família Vende Tudo
 2005 – 2 Filhos de Francisco
 2003 – O Preço da Paz
 2000 – Palavra e Utopia
 2000 – O Auto da Compadecida 
 2000 – Me You Them (Eu Tu Eles)
 1998 – Rio de Ouro
 1997 – Boleiros – Era uma Vez o Futebol
 1997 – A Ostra e o Vento
 1988 – Corpo em Delito
 1987 – Lua Cheia
 1983 – Sargento Getúlio
 1979 – Kilas, o Mau da Fita
 1979 – O Menino Arco-Íris
 1977 – O Crime do Zé Bigorna
 1977 – Os Sete Gatinhos
 1976 – O Jogo da Vida
 1976 – Contos Eróticos
 1976 – A Queda
 1974 – Guerra Conjugal
 1968 – Trilogia do Terror
 1963 – Rei Pelé
 1958 – Chão Bruto
 1957 – O Grande Momento
 1957 – Paixão de Gaúcho
 1955 – O Sobrado
 1949 – Quase no Céu

External links 

1930 births
Living people
Brazilian male film actors
Brazilian male voice actors
Brazilian people of Portuguese descent
Brazilian male telenovela actors
People from Minas Gerais

bpy:লিমা ডুয়ার্টে